Charles W. Fowell, Jr. was a member of the Wisconsin State Assembly.

Biography
Fowell was born on May 7, 1901 in Richland County, Wisconsin. He died on December 6, 1973 and is buried in Viroqua, Wisconsin.

Career
Fowell was a member of the Assembly from 1939 to 1942. Previously, he was Sheriff of Vernon County, Wisconsin. He was a Republican.

References

People from Richland County, Wisconsin
People from Vernon County, Wisconsin
Republican Party members of the Wisconsin State Assembly
Wisconsin sheriffs
1901 births
1973 deaths
20th-century American politicians